Gunay (also Romanized as Gūnāy, Goonay, Gūnāī, and Gūney) is a village in Shivanat Rural District, Afshar District, Khodabandeh County, Zanjan Province, Iran. At the 2006 census, its population was 188, in 45 families.

References 

Populated places in Khodabandeh County